Lalrin Fela (born 24 September 1990 in Mizoram) is an Indian footballer who plays as an attacking midfielder for Aizawl FC, Churchill Brothers, Southern Samity, Mohun Bagan, Mumbai City and Green Valley.

He is the first Mizo player to signed in Indian Super League history for  Mumbai City FC.

References 

Living people
1990 births
Indian footballers
Association football midfielders
Footballers from Mizoram
I-League players
Mohun Bagan AC players
Indian Super League players
Mumbai City FC players